Industrialized and developing countries have distinctly different rates of teenage pregnancy. In developed regions, such as United States, Canada, Western Europe, Australia, and  New Zealand, teen parents tend to be unmarried, and adolescent pregnancy is seen as a social issue.

By contrast, teenage parents in developing regions such as Africa, Asia, Eastern Europe, Latin America, and the Pacific Islands are often married, and their pregnancy may be welcomed by family and society. However, in these societies, early pregnancy may combine with malnutrition and poor health care to cause long-term medical problems for both the mother and child. A report by Save the Children found that, annually, 13 million children are born to women under age 20 worldwide. More than 90% of these births occur to women living in developing countries. Complications of pregnancy and childbirth are the leading cause of mortality among women between the ages of 15 and 19 in such areas, as they are the leading cause of mortality among older women.

The age of the mother is determined by the easily verified date when the pregnancy ends, not by the estimated date of conception.  Consequently, the statistics do not include women who first became pregnant before their 20th birthdays, if those pregnancies did not end until on or after their 20th birthdays.

Rates by continent

Africa

The highest rate of teenage pregnancy in the world—143 per 1,000 girls aged 15–19 years—is in sub-Saharan Africa. Women in Africa, in general, get married at a much younger age than women elsewhere—leading to earlier pregnancies. In Nigeria, according to the Health and Demographic Survey in 1992, 47% of women aged 20–24 were married before 15, and 87% before 18. Also, 53% of those surveyed had given birth to a child before the age of 18. African countries have the highest rates of teenage birth (2002) According to data from World Bank, as of 2015, the highest incidence of births among 15- to 19-year-old girls was in Niger, Mali, Angola, Guinea, and Mozambique. In Mozambique, in 2015, 46% of girls aged 15 to 19 years were already mothers or pregnant, an increase of 9% between results found on the National Demographic Health Survey in 2011 and National Survey on HIV, Malaria and Reproductive Health (IMASIDA) 2015. With the exception of Maputo, the country capital city, all provinces presented an increase in the percentage of early pregnancies. The rates are particularly higher in the northern provinces, namely, Cabo Delgado, Nampula and Niassa with 64.9%, 61.3% and 60%, respectively.
A Save the Children report identified 10 countries where motherhood carried the most risks for young women and their babies. Of these, 9 were in sub-Saharan Africa, and Niger, Liberia, and Mali were the nations where girls were the most at-risk. In the 10 highest-risk nations, more than one in six teenage girls between 15 and 19 years old gave birth annually, and nearly one in seven babies born to these teenagers died before the age of one year.

Asia
The rate of early marriage is higher in rural regions than it is in urbanized areas. Fertility rates in South Asia range from 71 to 119 births with a trend towards increasing age at marriage for both sexes. In South Korea and Singapore, although the occurrence of sexual intercourse before marriage has risen, rates of adolescent childbearing are low at 4 to 8 per 1000. The rate of early marriage and pregnancy has decreased sharply in Indonesia; however, it remains high in comparison to the rest of Asia.

Surveys from Thailand have found that a significant minority of unmarried adolescents are sexually active. Although premarital sex is considered normal behavior for males, particularly with prostitutes, it is not always regarded as such for females. Most Thai youth reported that their first sexual experience, whether within or outside of marriage, was without contraception. The adolescent fertility rate in Thailand is relatively high at 60 per 1000. 25% of women admitted to hospitals in Thailand for complications of induced abortion are students. The Thai government has undertaken measures to inform the nation's youth about the prevention of sexually transmitted diseases and unplanned pregnancy.

According to the World Health Organization, in several Asian countries including Bangladesh and Indonesia, a large proportion (26–37%) of deaths among female adolescents can be attributed to maternal causes.

Australia

In 2015, the birth rate among teenage women in Australia was 11.9 births per 1,000 women. The rate has fallen from 55.5 births per 1,000 women in 1971, probably due to ease of access to effective birth control, rather than any decrease in sexual activity.

Europe
The overall trend in Europe since 1970 has been a decrease in the total fertility rate, an increase in the age at which women experience their first birth, and a decrease in the number of births among teenagers.

The rates of teenage pregnancy may vary widely within a country. For instance, in the United Kingdom, the rate of adolescent pregnancy in 2002 was as high as 100.4 per 1000 among young women living in the London Borough of Lambeth, and as low as 20.2 per 1000 among residents in the Midlands local authority area of Rutland.

Teenage birth is often associated with economic and social issues: such as alcohol and drug misuse and, across 13 nations in the European Union, women who gave birth as teenagers were twice as likely to be living in poverty, compared with those who first gave birth when they were over 20.

Bulgaria and Romania
Romania and Bulgaria have some of the highest teenage birth rates in Europe. As of 2015, Bulgaria had a birth rate of 37 per 1,000 women aged 15–19, and Romania of 34. Both countries also have very large Romani populations, who have an occurrence of teenage pregnancies well above the local average.

In recent years, the number of teenage mothers is declining in Bulgaria.

Netherlands
The Netherlands has a low rate of births and abortions among teenagers (5 births per 1,000 women aged 15–19 in 2002). Compared with countries with higher teenage birth rates, the Dutch have a higher average age at first intercourse and increased levels of contraceptive use (including the "double Dutch" method of using both a hormonal contraception method and a condom).

Nordic countries
Nordic countries, such as Denmark and Sweden, also have low rates of teenage birth (both have 7 births per 1,000 women aged 15–19 in 2002). However, Norway's birth rate is slightly higher (11 births per 1,000 women aged 15–19 in 2002) and Iceland has a birth rate of 19 per 1,000 women aged 15–19  (nearly the same as the UK). These countries have higher abortion rates than the Netherlands.

Greece, Italy, Spain and Portugal
In some countries, such as Italy and Spain, the rate of adolescent pregnancy is low (6 births per 1,000 women aged 15–19 in 2002 in both countries). These two countries also have low abortion rates (lower than Sweden and the other Nordic countries) and their teenage pregnancy rates are among the lowest in Europe. However, Greece (10 births per 1,000 women aged 15–19 in 2002) and Portugal (17 births per 1,000 women aged 15–19 in 2002) have higher rates of teenage pregnancy.

United Kingdom
In 2018, conception rates for under 18-year-olds in England and Wales declined by 6.1% to 16.8 conceptions per 1,000 women aged 15 to 17 years. Since 1999, conception rates for women aged under 18 years have decreased by 62.7%.

The Americas

Canada
The Canadian teenage birth rate in 2002 was 16 per 1000  and the teenage pregnancy rate was 33.9. According to data from Statistics Canada, the Canadian teenage pregnancy rate has trended towards a steady decline for both younger (15–17) and older (18–19) teens in the period between 1992 and 2002. Canada's highest teen pregnancy rates occur in small towns located in rural parts of peninsular Ontario. Alberta and Quebec have high teen pregnancy rates as well.

Colombia

In 2016, the Minister of Health and Social Protection of Colombia, Alejandro Gaviria Uribe announced that "teenage pregnancy decreased by two percentage points breaking the growing tendency that had been seen since the nineties".

United States

In 2013, the teenage birth rate in the United States reached a historic low: 26.6 births per 1,000 women aged 15–19.  More than three-quarters of these births are to adult women aged 18 or 19.  In 2005 in the U.S., the majority (57%) of teen pregnancies resulted in a live birth, 27% ended in an induced abortion, and 16% in a fetal loss.

The U.S. teen birth rate was 53 births per 1,000 women aged 15–19 in 2002, the highest in the developed world. If all pregnancies, including those that end in abortion or miscarriage, are taken into account, the total rate in 2000 was 75.4 pregnancies per 1,000 girls. Nevada and the District of Columbia have the highest teen pregnancy rates in the U.S., while North Dakota has the lowest. Over 80% of teenage pregnancies in the U.S. are unintended; approximately one third end in abortion, one third end in spontaneous miscarriage, and one third will continue their pregnancy and keep their baby.

However, the trend is decreasing: in 1990, the birth rate was 61.8, and the pregnancy rate 116.9 per thousand. This decline has manifested across all races, although teenagers of African-American and Latino descent retain a higher rate, in comparison to that of European-Americans and Asian-Americans. The Guttmacher Institute attributed about 25% of the decline to abstinence and 75% to the effective use of contraceptives.

Within the United States teen pregnancy is often brought up in political discourse. The goal to limit teen pregnancy is shared by Republicans and Democrats, though avenues of reduction are usually different. Many Democrats cite teen pregnancy as proof of the continuing need for access to birth control and sexual education, while Republicans often cite a need for returning to conservative values, often including abstinence.

An inverse correlation has been noted between teen pregnancy rates and the quality of education in a state. A positive correlation, albeit weak, appears between a city's teen pregnancy rate and its average summer night temperature, especially in the Southern U.S. (Savageau, compiler, 1993–1995).

In 2022 research organization Child Trends found that teen birth in the United States had vastly reduced in the previous 30 years.

Statistics

World Development Indicator 
The birth rate for women aged 15–19 is one of the World Bank's World Development Indicators. The data for most countries and a variety of groupings (e.g. Sub-Saharan Africa or OECD members) are published regularly, and can be viewed or downloaded from a United Nations website.

UN Statistics Division, live birth 2009
Per 1,000 women 15–19 years old:

UN Statistics Division, estimates 1995-2010
Per 1,000 women 15–19 years old, source:

Birth and abortion rates, 1996
Per 1000 women 15–19 (% aborted = % of teenage pregnancies ending in abortion), source:

See also
Adolescent sexuality in the United States
Teenage pregnancy in the United Kingdom

References

Teenage pregnancy
Teenage pregnancy